Kamala Lyn Parks is an American drummer and songwriter from Berkeley, California. She played drums for Kamala & The Karnivores (with Ivy DuBois of Bitch Fight and Sweet Baby, Lynda Skulpone, and Michelle Cruz Gonzales of Bitch Fight and Spitboy), Cringer, The Gr’ups, Naked Aggression, and Hers Never Existed.

In 1986, Victor Hayden and Kamala partnered with Maximumrocknroll to establish 924 Gilman Street, an all-ages collectively organized music venue in Berkeley. She was instrumental in finding the warehouse in North Berkeley that became home to the local punk scene. She also actively participated in the city council meeting for the venue's zoning approval. For years, she booked shows at Gilman, while also cultivating a national tour network for punk bands such as Operation Ivy, Neurosis, and Citizen Fish.

She starred in and acted as a consultant for the 2018 movie Turn It Around: The Story of East Bay Punk.

Discography

With Kamala & the Karnivores 
 Vanity Project (Song Preserve, 2018)
 "Back To Bodie" in the Turn It Around: The Story of East Bay Punk soundtrack (1, 2, 3, 4 Go Records, 2018)
 Girl Band 7-inch EP (Lookout Records, 1989)

With The Gr'ups 
 The Gr'ups 7-inch EP (Immature Records, Zafio Records, 1992)
 Buildings Are The Purtiest Trees I've Seen 7-inch, EP (Zafio Records, Duotone Records, 1993)
 A Li'l Lost 1992-1994 (Recess Records, 2011)

References 

Year of birth missing (living people)
Living people
American women songwriters
American women drummers
Musicians from Berkeley, California
Songwriters from California
21st-century American women